Dr. Musadik Masood Malik is a Pakistani politician who has been a Member of the Senate of Pakistan since March 2018 and serves as the Minister of State for Petroleum since 28 April 2022. He served as the Federal Minister of Water and Power in Khoso caretaker ministry in 2013.

Education
Malik graduated in Pharmacy from the University of the Punjab. He did a Doctor of Philosophy and Master of Science in Healthcare Administration and Policy from the University of Illinois.

Political career

Malik was inducted into the federal cabinet of caretaker Prime Minister Mir Hazar Khan Khoso on 3 April 2013 and was appointed as Federal Minister for Water and Power where he served until 4 June 2013.

In November 2014, Malik was appointed as spokesperson for Prime Minister Nawaz Sharif.

In August 2017, he was appointed as Special Assistant to Prime Minister Shahid Khaqan Abbasi on Media Affairs.

He was nominated by Pakistan Muslim League (N) (PML-N) as its candidate in 2018 Pakistani Senate election. However the Election Commission of Pakistan declared all PML-N candidates for the Senate election as independent after a ruling of the Supreme Court of Pakistan.

Malik was elected to the Senate of Pakistan as an independent candidate on general seat from Punjab in Senate election. He was backed in the election by PML-N and joined the treasury benches, led by PML-N after getting elected. He took oath as Senator on 12 March 2018.

In April 2018, he was given the status of federal minister in the cabinet of Prime Minister Shahid Khaqan Abbasi.

References

Living people
Pakistan Muslim League (N) politicians
Members of the Senate of Pakistan
University of the Punjab alumni
University of Illinois alumni
Federal ministers of Pakistan
Year of birth missing (living people)